The Bram Stoker Award for Best Illustrated Narrative is an award presented by the Horror Writers Association (HWA) for "superior achievement" in horror writing for comic books.

Honorees 
Nominees are listed below the winner(s) for each year.

References

External links 

 Official website

Illustrated Narrative